Arnottia is a genus of flowering plants from the orchid family, Orchidaceae. It is known only from Mauritius and Réunion Islands in the Indian Ocean. Four species are recognized (as of May 2014):

Arnottia imbellis (Frapp. ex Cordem.) Schltr. - Réunion
Arnottia inermis (Thouars) S.Moore in J.G.Baker - Mauritius
Arnottia mauritiana A.Rich. - Mauritius and Réunion
Arnottia simplex (Frapp. ex Cordem.) Schltr. - Réunion

See also 
 List of Orchidaceae genera

References 

Pridgeon, A.M., Cribb, P.J., Chase, M.A. & Rasmussen, F. eds. (1999). Genera Orchidacearum 1. Oxford Univ. Press.
Pridgeon, A.M., Cribb, P.J., Chase, M.A. & Rasmussen, F. eds. (2001). Genera Orchidacearum 2. Oxford Univ. Press.
Pridgeon, A.M., Cribb, P.J., Chase, M.A. & Rasmussen, F. eds. (2003). Genera Orchidacearum 3. Oxford Univ. Press
Berg Pana, H. 2005. Handbuch der Orchideen-Namen. Dictionary of Orchid Names. Dizionario dei nomi delle orchidee. Ulmer, Stuttgart

External links
Les Orquidées Françaises - Orchidoideae - Orchideae - Habenariinae / Arnottia mauritiana.
Fleurs fruits feuilles de L'île de la Réunion et d'ailleurs,  Arnottia mauritiana 

Orchideae genera
Orchids of Mauritius
Orchids of Réunion